The Lincoln Center for Family and Youth (TLC), headquartered in Audubon, Pennsylvania, is a nonprofit alternative education and social services agency that provides education, coaching, and counseling services to students and families who need socioemotional and mental health support. TLC was established in 1970 as a community-based services division of the Eagleville Hospital in Eagleville, Pennsylvania. In 1975, TLC opened its first alternative school to serve at-risk public school students. TLC incorporated in 1983 and became an independent 501(c)(3) nonprofit educational organization. Today, TLC provides an experiential problem-based learning alternative education program for students in grades 7-12, in-school individual counseling services for public school students, mobile coaching and counseling services for children and their families, trauma-informed counseling services for victims of crime, and college and career readiness services for at-risk public school students.

References

High schools in Pennsylvania
Health centers
Clinics in the United States
1970 establishments in Pennsylvania